Pervomaisc is a community in the Slobozia District of Transnistria, Moldova. Since 1990, It has been administered as a part of the breakaway Transnistrian Moldovan Republic.

References

Villages of Transnistria
Slobozia District